Abortion in East Timor is only legal if the abortion will save the woman's life, an exception made by Parliament in 2009. Women's groups and NGOs have been advocating for abortion laws to include instances of rape, incest, and child endangerment.

In East Timor, any abortion approved to preserve the woman's health requires consent from three physicians. All other abortions are criminal offenses, and the person who performs the abortion as well as the pregnant woman face up to three years of imprisonment.

History 
Abortion law in East Timor is based on the abortion law of Indonesia which ruled East Timor between 1976 and 1999 and which has been updated since independence in 2002.

References 

Healthcare in East Timor
East Timor
East Timor